Seyyed Mohammad-Kazem Mousavi-Bojnourdi (born 1942 in Najaf, Iraq) is an Iranian historian, theologian and writer.

He was the curator of the National Library of Iran from 1997 to 2005 and founder of Center for the Great Islamic Encyclopedia which is a Tehran-based research institute on Iranian and Islamic culture.

References

External links
 Payvand news
 Iran Human Rights: Mousavi Bojnourdi's views on Baha’ism
 Kazem Mousavi-Bojnourdi at the International Research Center for Philosophy
 Tag Archives: Kazem Mousavi-Bojnourdi
 Kazem Mousavi-Bojnourdi at IMDb
 The Centre for the Great Islamic Encyclopaedia
 Center for Human Rights in Iran

Iranian writers
Living people
1942 births
Al-Moussawi family
Islamic Republican Party politicians
Islamic Nations Party members
People from Bojnord
Heads of the National Library of Iran